Schiavinatoite is a very rare mineral, a natural niobium borate with the chemical formula . Schiavinatoite is classified as monoborate. It contains tetrahedral borate anion instead of planar BO3 group, which is more common among minerals.  Schiavinatoite is one of the most simple niobium minerals. It forms a solid solution with its tantalum-analogue, béhierite. Both minerals possess zircon-type structure (tetragonal, space group I41/amd) and occur in pegmatites. Schiavinatoite and nioboholtite are minerals with essential niobium and boron.

Occurrence and association
Schiavinatoite was detected in miaroles of a pegmatite at Antsongombato, Madagascar. It coexists with an apatite-group mineral, béhierite, danburite, elbaite–liddicoatite, feldspar, pollucite, quartz, rhodizite, and spodumene.

Crystal structure
The main facts about schiavinatoite's structure:
 isostructural with zircon
 niobium coordination number of 8 (coordination polyhedron is distorted triangular dodecahedron)
 tetrahedrally-coordinated boron
 chains of edge-sharing BO4 and NbO8 polyhedra, parallel to [001]
 edge-sharing dodecahedra link the chains

References

Borate minerals
Niobium minerals
Oxide minerals
Tetragonal minerals
Minerals in space group 141